Rotuma may refer to:

Rotuma Group - a group of volcanic islands that constitute a dependency of Fiji
Republic of Rotuma - a proposed state
Rotuma Island - the main island in that group
Rotuma (Rotuman Communal Constituency, Fiji) - an electoral division of Fiji, the sole communal constituency reserved for citizens of Rotuman descent
Rotuma (fish) - a monotypic fish genus in the family Xenisthmidae
Rotuma myzomela - a species of honeyeater endemic to Rotuma

See also
Rotuman (disambiguation)